Bargaun  is a village and municipality in Humla District in the Karnali Zone of north-western Nepal. At the time of the 1991 Nepal census it had a population of 1021 persons living in 137 individual households. Its ward number was 5 before the country Nepal was divided into Providence or state and now after   Country dividing into State the current ward number of this village is 3.

References

External links
UN map of the municipalities of Dolpa District

Populated places in Humla District